Whitney v. California, 274 U.S. 357 (1927), was a United States Supreme Court decision upholding the conviction of an individual who had engaged in speech that raised a threat to society. Whitney was explicitly overruled by Brandenburg v. Ohio in 1969.

Background
Charlotte Anita Whitney, a member of a distinguished California family, was convicted under the 1919 California Criminal Syndicalism Act for allegedly helping to establish the Communist Labor Party of America, a group charged by the state with teaching the violent overthrow of government.

Whitney denied that it had been the intention of her or other organizers for the party to become an instrument of violence.

Decision
The question before the court was whether the 1919 Criminal Syndicalism Act of California violated the Fourteenth Amendment's Due Process and Equal Protection Clauses. The Court unanimously upheld Whitney's conviction. Justice Sanford wrote for the seven-justice majority opinion and invoked the Holmes test of "clear and present danger" but also went further.

The Court held that the state, in exercise of its police power, has the power to punish those who abuse their rights to freedom of speech "by utterances inimical to the public welfare, tending to incite crime, disturb the public peace, or endanger the foundations of organized government and threaten its overthrow." In other words, words with a "bad tendency" can be punished.

Brandeis's concurrence 
The case is most noted for Justice Louis Brandeis's concurrence, which many scholars have lauded as perhaps the greatest defense of freedom of speech ever written by a member of the high court. Justices Brandeis and Holmes concurred because of the Fourteenth Amendment questions, but there is no question the sentiments are a distinct dissent from the views of the prevailing majority and supported the First Amendment.

Holmes, in Abrams, had been willing to defend speech on abstract grounds: that unpopular ideas should have their opportunity to compete in the "marketplace of ideas." Brandeis, however, had a much more specific reason for defending speech, and the power of his opinion derives from the connection he made between free speech and the democratic process.

He held citizens have an obligation to take part in the governing process, and they cannot do so unless they can discuss and criticize governmental policy fully and without fear. If the government can punish unpopular views, it cramps freedom, and in the long run, that will strangle democratic processes. Thus, free speech is not only an abstract virtue but also a key element at the heart of a democratic society.

Implicitly, Brandeis here moves far beyond the "clear and present danger" test, and insists on what some have called a "time to answer" test: no danger flowing from speech can be considered "clear and present" if there is full opportunity for discussion. While upholding full and free speech, Brandeis tells legislatures, while they have a right to curb truly dangerous expression, they must define clearly the nature of that danger. Mere fear of unpopular ideas will not do:

Subsequent jurisprudence and further developments
Justice William O. Douglas believed that had Brandeis lived longer, he would have abandoned the clear and present danger test; Whitney is in fact the precursor to the position Douglas and Hugo L. Black took in the 1950s and 1960s, that freedom of speech is absolutely protected under the First Amendment. Brandeis does not go that far here, and his views were ultimately adopted by the Court in Brandenburg v. Ohio, 395 U.S. 444 (1969), in which the U.S. Supreme Court explicitly overruled Whitney.

Whitney was later pardoned by the Governor of California based on Justice Brandeis' concurring opinion.

Quotes

Commentary

Philippa Strum, former director of the Division of United States Studies at the Woodrow Wilson International Center for Scholars, has asserted that Whitney was a pacifist who believed in working within the American political system. According to Strum, the evidence presented at the trial focused on the platform and actions of the Industrial Workers of the World (IWW), a radical organization to which Whitney had contributed a small amount of money, but of which she was not a member. Whitney was, in effect, put on trial for her association with the IWW as well as her own reform activities, which included fighting for gender and racial equality and advocating a more equitable political and economic system.

See also
Clear and present danger
Imminent lawless action
List of United States Supreme Court cases, volume 274
Shouting fire in a crowded theater
Threatening the president of the United States
Abrams v. United States, 
Brandenburg v. Ohio, 
Chaplinsky v. New Hampshire, 
Dennis v. United States, 
Feiner v. New York, 
Hess v. Indiana, 
Korematsu v. United States, 
Kunz v. New York, 
Masses Publishing Co. v. Patten, (1917)
Sacher v. United States,  
Schenck v. United States, 
Terminiello v. Chicago,

References

Further reading

 Strum, Philippa (2015). Speaking Freely: Whitney V. California and American Speech Law. Lawrence, KS: University Press of Kansas.

External links

First Amendment Library entry on Whitney v. California
Major ACLU Cases by Decade

1927 in United States case law
United States Supreme Court cases
United States Supreme Court cases of the Taft Court
United States Free Speech Clause case law
American Civil Liberties Union litigation
1927 in California
Legal history of California
Overruled United States Supreme Court decisions